Hindsiclava alesidota, common name the lean turris, is a species of sea snail, a marine gastropod mollusc in the family Pseudomelatomidae, the turrids.

Description
The length of the shell varies between 20 mm and 53 mm.

(Original description) The large, slender shell is ashy brown or light brown, pointed and rudely sculptured. It contains 10 whorls, with a protoconch of about two whorls, round, small, glassy, smooth and inflated. The fasciole is slightly concave, nearly smooth, very steep, separated from the suture by a smoothish space, marginated by a slightly raised thread. The suture is appressed. The spiral sculpture consists of numerous subequal little elevated revolving threads with wider interspaces. They are strongest on the summit of the riblets and faint in the interspaces. There are about five in front of the fasciole and between it and the next suture. They are fainter on the siphonal canal. The transverse sculpture consists of numerous (on the penultimate whorl 28) narrow, little elevated, slightly oblique riblets, beginning and strongest at the fasciole, and passing over the whorl to fade away on the base. The thin margin of the suture is sometimes undulated by passing over them. The aperture is narrow and long. The notch is rounded and not deep. The outer lip is simple, thin, arched forward, not constricted for the siphonal canal. The inner lip is simple and shows a slight callus, thicker at the posterior angle opposite the notch. The columella is straight, attenuated and somewhat twisted in front. The siphonal canal is wide and slightly recurved.

Distribution
This marine species occurs between North Carolina and Texas, USA; and off  Barbados and French Guiana.

References

  W.H. Dall (1889) A preliminary catalogue of the shell-bearing marine mollusks and brachiopods of the southeastern coast of the United States, with illustrations of many of the species; Bulletin of the United States National Museum ; no. 37.

External links
 Rosenberg G., Moretzsohn F. & García E. F. (2009). Gastropoda (Mollusca) of the Gulf of Mexico, Pp. 579–699 in Felder, D.L. and D.K. Camp (eds.), Gulf of Mexico–Origins, Waters, and Biota. Biodiversity. Texas A&M Press, College Station, Texas
 Census of Marine Life (2012). SYNDEEP: Towards a first global synthesis of biodiversity, biogeography and ecosystem function in the deep sea.
 
 

alesidota
Gastropods described in 1889